"Feed the Machine" is the second single by the American Christian rock band Red on their third full-length studio album Until We Have Faces. The song was written by Anthony Armstrong, Joe Rickard, Rob Graves, Jasen Rauch and Mark Holman. The song was released on February 16, 2011, although it was sent to all the fans who submitted their faces as part of the hype for the new album on December 9, 2010.

Background and production
The song is the opening track from Until We Have Faces. Guitarist Anthony Armstrong expounded on the song in an interview with Noisecreep: "It's us pointing a sarcastic finger at ourselves and at the people that have let the world define them," he said. "It's this 'give up, give up, you've already fed the machine' – all those things in the world that are negative, all those things that don't have any effect on us that can be inspiring."

Charts

References

2011 songs
2011 singles
Red (American band) songs
Essential Records (Christian) singles
Songs written by Rob Graves